Chloantha is a genus of moths of the family Noctuidae.

Species
 Chloantha elbursica (Boursin, 1967)
 Chloantha hyperici (Denis & Schiffermüller, 1775)

References
 Chloantha at Markku Savela's Lepidoptera and Some Other Life Forms
 Natural History Museum Lepidoptera genus database

External links
 
 

Xyleninae